Ellenfény is an online Hungarian language art and theatre magazine published in Budapest, Hungary. It was a print publication between 1996 and 2007.

History and profile
Ellenfény was established in 1996. Új Színházért Alpítvány is the publisher of Ellenfény, which is based in Budapest. In December 2007 print edition of the magazine ceased publication, and it became an online magazine. Although magazine is published in Hungarian, it also provides English summaries of the articles. The magazine primarily focuses on contemporary dance and theatre.

Beja Margitházi, a film theoretician, is among the contributors of the magazine.

See also
 List of magazines in Hungary

References

External links
 

1996 establishments in Hungary
2007 disestablishments in Hungary
Dance magazines
Defunct magazines published in Hungary
Hungarian-language magazines
Magazines established in 1996
Magazines disestablished in 2007
Magazines published in Budapest
Online magazines with defunct print editions
Theatre magazines
Visual arts magazines